During the 2018–19 season, Málaga CF participated in the Segunda División and the Copa del Rey.

Current squad

Out on loan

Competitions

Overall

Segunda División

League table

Matches

Promotion play-offs

Semifinals

Copa del Rey

Second round

Statistics

Appearances and goals
Last updated on 15 June 2019.

|-
! colspan=14 style=background:#dcdcdc; text-align:center|Goalkeepers

|-
! colspan=14 style=background:#dcdcdc; text-align:center|Defenders

|-
! colspan=14 style=background:#dcdcdc; text-align:center|Midfielders

|-
! colspan=14 style=background:#dcdcdc; text-align:center|Forwards

|-
! colspan=14 style=background:#dcdcdc; text-align:center| Players who have made an appearance or had a squad number this season but have left the club

|-
|}

References

Málaga CF seasons
Málaga